Lypsimena fuscata is a species of beetle in the family Cerambycidae. It was described by Haldeman in 1847. It is known from the United States, Bahamas, Guyana, Brazil, Colombia, Cuba, Panama, Puerto Rico, the Dominican Republic, Haiti, Jamaica, French Guiana, Mexico, Paraguay, Argentina, Uruguay, Honduras, and Venezuela.

References

Pogonocherini
Beetles described in 1847
Taxa named by Samuel Stehman Haldeman